Eglisau railway station is a railway station in the Swiss canton of Zurich and municipality of Eglisau. The station is located on the Winterthur to Koblenz line, at that line's junction with the Eglisau to Neuhausen line. Both lines are owned by Swiss Federal Railways. It is served by Zürich S-Bahn lines S9, between Zürich and Schaffhausen, and S36, between Bülach and Koblenz.

The railway crosses the Eglisau railway bridge over the Rhine, between Eglisau and the next station, Hüntwangen-Wil on the Eglisau to Neuhausen line.

Services
 the following services stop at Eglisau:

 Zürich S-Bahn:

References

External links 
 
 

Eglisau
Eglisau